Roy is a city in Pierce County, Washington, United States. The population was 816 at the 2020 census.

History
Roy was officially incorporated on January 16, 1908. It is a rural city outside Tacoma and primarily features ranch-style homes and farms. Roy was one of the early communities in the area, a prosperous boom-town and a major stop on the railroad line. But 3 major blows reduced this once-thriving town to its current form. A major fire in 1929 wiped out most of the downtown businesses just before the Depression started. The railroad eventually discontinued using Roy as a main stop. The Army annexed most of the surrounding land to the north and west, limiting expansion and the local tax base, and erasing the nearby community of Loveland.

Major features and/or attractions in Roy and the vicinity include the Roy Pioneer Rodeo, attracting participants and spectators from several states and Canada.

Geography
Roy is located at  (47.003382, -122.544171).

Although the intersection of SR 7 and SR 507 is known as the Roy "Y", the intersection is in Spanaway, about seven miles northeast of Roy.

Notable People
Morgan Hicks, 2004 Olympian in women's Three Position Rifle.

Demographics

2010 census
As of the census of 2010, there were 793 people, 303 households, and 215 families living in the city. The racial makeup of the city was 82.0% White, 3.2% African American, 2.4% Native American, 3.7% Asian, 0.9% Pacific Islander, 0.8% from other races, and 7.2% from two or more races. Hispanic or Latino of any race were 3.8% of the population.

There were 303 households, of which 38.3% had children under the age of 18 living with them, 49.8% were married couples living together, 14.9% had a female householder with no husband present, 6.3% had a male householder with no wife present, and 29.0% were non-families. 22.8% of all households were made up of individuals, and 6.3% had someone living alone who was 65 years of age or older. The average household size was 2.62 and the average family size was 3.07.

The median age in the city was 35.9 years. 26% of residents were under the age of 18; 9.8% were between the ages of 18 and 24; 29% were from 25 to 44; 26.6% were from 45 to 64; and 8.6% were 65 years of age or older. The gender makeup of the city was 49.9% male and 50.1% female.

2000 census
As of the census of 2000, there were 260 people, 102 households, and 68 families living in the city. The population density was 995.2 people per square mile (386.1/km2). There were 114 housing units at an average density of 436.4 per square mile (169.3/km2). The racial makeup of the city was 81.15% White, 0.77% African American, 3.46% Native American, 2.31% Asian, 3.85% from other races, and 8.46% from two or more races. Hispanic or Latino of any race were 8.08% of the population.

There were 102 households, out of which 32.4% had children under the age of 18 living with them, 48.0% were married couples living together, 12.7% had a female householder with no husband present, and 32.4% were non-families. 23.5% of all households were made up of individuals, and 15.7% had someone living alone who was 65 years of age or older. The average household size was 2.55 and the average family size was 2.96.

In the city, the age distribution of the population shows 26.2% under the age of 18, 11.5% from 18 to 24, 28.5% from 25 to 44, 23.5% from 45 to 64, and 10.4% who were 65 years of age or older. The median age was 34 years. For every 100 females, there were 97.0 males. For every 100 females age 18 and over, there were 97.9 males.

The median income for a household in the city was $32,727, and the median income for a family was $34,643. Males had a median income of $31,964 versus $21,477 for females. The per capita income for the city was $14,527. About 6.8% of families and 10.8% of the population were below the poverty line, including 12.1% of those under the age of eighteen and none of those 65 or over.

References

External links
 City of Roy, Official website
 

Cities in Pierce County, Washington
Cities in Washington (state)
Cities in the Seattle metropolitan area